Elpidio Coppa (October 6, 1914 in Milan — August 31, 1978 in Lucca) was an Italian professional football player.

External links
Maglia Rossonera profile 
Stade Rennais Online profile 

1914 births
Year of death missing
Italian footballers
Serie A players
Serie B players
Inter Milan players
Aurora Pro Patria 1919 players
S.S.D. Lucchese 1905 players
A.C. Milan players
U.C. Sampdoria players
Spezia Calcio players
Italian expatriate footballers
Expatriate footballers in France
Italian expatriate sportspeople in France
Ligue 1 players
Stade Rennais F.C. players
Association football midfielders
A.S.D. Fanfulla players